Richard Mills may refer to:

Richard Mills (composer) (born 1949), Australian composer and conductor
Richard Charles Mills (1886–1952), Australian economist and academic
Richard Henry Mills (born 1929), U.S. federal judge
Richard Mills (cricketer) (1798–1882), English cricketer
Richard M. Mills Jr. (born 1959), U.S. diplomat and ambassador to Armenia as of 2015
Richard P. Mills (educator) (1944–2017), American educator
Richard P. Mills (general) (born 1950), United States Marine Corps general
Rick Mills (born 1957), American glass artist
Dick Mills (born 1936), British sound engineer
Dick Mills (baseball) (1945–2015), Major League Baseball pitcher

See also
Richard Milles (c. 1735–1820), MP for Canterbury